Cheonggyecheon (Hangul: 청계천) is a  modern public recreation space in downtown Seoul, South Korea. The massive urban renewal project is on the site of a stream that flowed before the rapid post-war economic development caused it to be covered by transportation infrastructure. The US$335 million project initially attracted much public criticism, however, since its opening in 2005, it has become popular among residents and tourists.

Geography
Cheonggyecheon is an  stream flowing west to east through downtown Seoul, and then meeting Jungnangcheon, which connects to the Han River and empties into the Yellow Sea. During the Park Chung-hee presidency, Cheonggyecheon was covered with concrete for roads. In 1968, an elevated highway was built over it.

History 

The stream was named as Gaecheon ("open stream") after the first refurbishment project to construct a drainage system during the Joseon Dynasty. The work, which included dredging and bolstering the banks of the stream and building the bridges, was carried out every 2–3 years during this period from the reign of Taejong, the third king of the Joseon Dynasty. King Yeonjo especially undertook the refurbishment work as a national project.

Gaecheon was renamed to Cheonggyecheon, its current name, when Korea was under Japanese rule. During this time, financial difficulties disrupted and prevented Japanese forces from covering up the stream despite several attempts to do so.

After the Korean War, more people migrated into Seoul to make their living and settled down along the stream in shabby makeshift houses. The accompanying trash, sand, and waste, and deteriorating conditions resulted in an eyesore for the city. The area became an example of successful industrialization and modernization of South Korea.

Restoration

In July 2003, then-Seoul mayor Lee Myung-bak, initiated a project to remove the elevated highway and restore the stream. It was a major undertaking since the highway had to be removed and years of neglect and development had left the stream nearly dry. 120,000 tons of water were to be pumped in daily from the Han River, its tributaries, and groundwater from subway stations. There were safety problems due to the deteriorated concrete. Still, restoration of Cheonggyecheon was deemed important as it fit in with the movement to re-introduce nature to the city and to promote a more eco-friendly urban design. Other goals of the project were to restore the history and culture of the region, which had been lost for 30 years, and to revitalize Seoul's economy.

The Seoul Metropolitan Government established several organizations to oversee the successful restoration of Cheonggyecheon: the Cheonggyecheon Restoration Project Headquarters for the control of the whole project; the Citizen's Committee for Cheonggyecheon Restoration Project for the management of conflict between the Seoul Metropolitan Government and the union of merchants; and the Cheonggyecheon Restoration Research Corps for the establishment and review of the restoration plan.

To address the consequent traffic problem, the Cheonggyecheon Restoration Project Headquarters established traffic flow measures in the downtown section affected by the restoration work and coordinated changes in the downtown traffic system based on the research of the Cheonggyecheon Restoration Research Corps.

The restoration of two historic bridges, Gwangtonggyo and Supyogyo, was also a contentious issue, as several interest groups voiced opinions on how to restore historical and cultural sites and remains and whether to replace the bridges or not.

The Cheonggyecheon restoration project had the purpose of preserving the unique identity of the natural environment and the historic resources in the CBD of Seoul, and to reinforce the surrounding business area with information technology, international affairs and digital industries. The plan encouraged the return of the pedestrian-friendly road network connecting the stream with traditional resources: Bukchon, Daehangno, Jungdong, Namchon, and Donhwamungil. This network system, named the CCB (Cheonggyecheon Culture Belt), tried to build the cultural and environmental basis of the city.

Achievements 
The stream was opened to the public in September 2005 and was lauded as a major success in urban renewal and beautification. However, there was considerable opposition from the previous mayoral administration of Goh Kun, which feared gentrification of the adjacent areas that housed many shops and small businesses in the machine trades.

Creating an environment with clean water and natural habitats was the most significant achievement of the project. Species of fish, birds, and insects have increased significantly as a result of the stream excavation. The stream helps to cool down the temperature on the nearby areas by 3.6 °C on average versus other parts of Seoul. The number of vehicles entering downtown Seoul has decreased by 2.3%, with an increasing number of users of buses (by 1.4%) and subways (by 4.3%: a daily average of 430,000 people) as a result of the demolition of the two heavily used roads. This has a positive influence by improving the atmospheric environment in the region.

The project attempted to promote the urban economy through amplifying urban infrastructure for a competitive city in the business and industrial area centered on the stream. The urban renewal project was the catalyst of revitalization in downtown Seoul. Cheonggyecheon became a centre for cultural and economic activities.

Cheonggyecheon restoration work brought balance to the areas south and north of the stream. During the modernization era, downtown Seoul was divided into two parts, north–south, based on their features and function. The restoration helped to join these parts to create a new urban structure connecting the cultural and environmental resources in northern and southern areas of the stream (Hwang n.d.), resulting in a balanced and sustainable development of northern and southern areas of the Han River.

The project sped up traffic around the city when the motorway was removed. It has been cited as a real-life example of Braess's paradox.

Cost
Budgeted at 349 billion won, the final cost of the project was over 386 billion won (approximately US$281 million).

Some Korean environmental organizations have criticized its high costs and lack of  ecological and historical authenticity, calling it purely symbolic and not truly beneficial to the city's eco-environment. Instead of using the restoration as an instrument of urban development the environmental organizations have called for a gradual long-term ecological and historical recovery of the entire Cheonggyecheon stream basin and its ecological system.

The cost of managing Cheonggyecheon has been rising every year. From October 2005 to the end of 2016, maintenance and management cost of Cheonggyecheon totalled 85.7 billion won, which averaged out to 7.1 billion won per year.

Gallery

See also
 Rivers of Korea
 Daylighting, the process of revealing rivers which have previously been covered over as part of urban development
 Seoul Peace Market
 Gwangjang Market
 Gwanghwamun Plaza
 Seoul Plaza

Notes

Further reading

External links

 
 
 
 

Rivers of Seoul
Tourist attractions in Seoul
Demolished highways
Geography of Jung District, Seoul
Geography of Jongno District
Urban public parks
Redeveloped ports and waterfronts in South Korea
Linear parks